The Keystone Motor Company of Philadelphia was the manufacturer of a veteran era automobile in Philadelphia, Pennsylvania in 1900.

History 
Keystone manufactured a water-cooled, single-cylinder engine that delivered . This engine was made available to  other manufacturers. Three models, all priced at US$750, with a wheelbase of 52 in.and tiller steering were offered.

The Autocycle was a runabout for two passengers. The engine was standing free behind the seat without protection by a hood. The vehicle had wire wheels, those in front being slightly larger.

The Wagonette was also a runabout but looked more modern and resembled the Oldsmobile Curved Dash.  The front panel was curved outward and  fenders with step plate were fitted. The engine was concealed in a compartment under the seat, a canopy top was an option.

A third model was the Parcel Delivery  that accommodated the driver only.

In the summer of 1900, Keystone reported that 75 engines, five Autocycles and four Wagonettes were built and sold in its first month.

Philadelphia businessmen (among them Theodore C. Search, head of the Stetson Hat Company) purchased Keystone five months after the car was introduced. This became the Searchmont Motor Company . Keystone chief engineer Edward B. Gallaher became plant manager for the Searchmont.

Sources 
 G.N. Georgano (editor): Complete Encyclopedia of Motorcars, 1885 to the Present; Dutton Press, New York, 2. Auflage (Hardcover) 1973, 

Defunct motor vehicle manufacturers of the United States
History of Philadelphia
Defunct companies based in Pennsylvania
Vehicle manufacturing companies established in 1900
1900 establishments in Pennsylvania
American companies established in 1900
Vehicle manufacturing companies disestablished in 1900
1900 disestablishments in Pennsylvania
1900 mergers and acquisitions

Veteran vehicles
1900s cars
Cars introduced in 1900